Altis was the original name of the Ancient Greek religious sanctuary of Olympia, Greece 

Altis or ALTIS may also refer to:
 Altis Semiconductor, an independent French company
 ALTIS – Postgraduate School Business & Society, the business school of Università Cattolica del Sacro Cuore in Milan, Italy
 Toyota Camry, a car, also known as Daihatsu Altis
 Toyota Corolla, a car, also known as Toyota Corolla Altis
 Altis, a fictional island in the computer game ARMA 3 that is based on Lemnos, Greece

See also 
 Dismorphia altis, a butterfly in the family Pieridae
 Alti, a fictional character in Xena: Warrior Princess